The Battle of Cirencester was fought in 628 at Cirencester in modern-day England. The conflict involved the armies of Mercia, under King Penda, and the Gewisse (predecessors of the West Saxons), under Kings Cynegils and Cwichelm. The Mercians defeated the Gewisse and, according to Bede, "after reaching an agreement", took control of the Severn valley and the minor kingdom of the Hwicce, which had been under the influence of the Gewisse since the Battle of Dyrham in 577.

References

Cirencester 628
Cirencester 628
Cirencester
Cirencester
628
7th century in England
Cirencester